Arenimonas maotaiensis is a Gram-negative and facultatively anaerobic bacterium from the genus of Arenimonas which has been isolated from water from the Maotai section of the Chishui River in China.

References

Xanthomonadales
Bacteria described in 2014